The Lacrimosa (Latin for "weeping/tearful"), also a name that derives from Our Lady of Sorrows, a title given to The Virgin Mary, is part of the Dies Irae sequence in the Roman Catholic Requiem Mass. Its text comes from the Latin 18th and 19th stanzas of the sequence. Many composers, including Mozart, Berlioz, and Verdi have set the text as a discrete movement of the Requiem.

 Lacrimosa dies illa
 Qua resurget ex favilla
 Judicandus homo reus.
 Huic ergo parce, Deus:
 Pie Jesu Domine,
 Dona eis requiem. Amen.

 Full of tears will be that day
 When from the ashes shall arise 
 The guilty man to be judged;
 Therefore spare him, O God,
 Merciful Lord Jesus,
 Grant them eternal rest. Amen.

See also
Dies irae
Requiem (Berlioz)
Requiem (Dvořák)
Requiem (Mozart)
Requiem (Verdi)

References

Latin-language Christian hymns